Ugo de Spina (died 1523) was a Roman Catholic prelate who served as Bishop-elect of Bagnoregio (1522–1523).

Biography
In December 1522, Ugo de Spina was appointed during the papacy of Pope Adrian VI as Bishop of Bagnoregio. He served as Bishop of Bagnoregio until his death in 1523.

References

External links and additional sources
 (for Chronology of Bishops) 
 (for Chronology of Bishops) 

16th-century Italian Roman Catholic bishops
1523 deaths
Bishops appointed by Pope Adrian VI